The Wonderful Wizard of Oz is a 1900 children's novel written by American author L. Frank Baum. Since its first publication in 1900, it has been adapted many times: for film, television, theatre, books, comics, games, and other media.

Film

Live-action, English language

Adaptations 

 The Fairylogue and Radio-Plays is a 1908 multimedia presentation made by L. Frank Baum which featured the young silent film actress Romola Remus.
 The Wonderful Wizard of Oz is a 15-minute 1910 film, based on the 1902 stage musical, directed by Otis Turner, and may have featured Bebe Daniels as Dorothy. 
It was followed by three now-lost films also directed  by Turner: 
Dorothy and the Scarecrow in Oz, 
The Land of Oz, and 
John Dough and the Cherub, based on another Baum novel of the same name.
 The Patchwork Girl of Oz is a 1914 adaptation produced by Baum's live-action motion picture company, The Oz Film Manufacturing Company. It follows the adventures of Ojo, Unc Nunkie, and Patchwork Girl in their quest for the ingredients needed for a magic potion. The film is partially lost due to a missing scene early in the film.
 His Majesty, the Scarecrow of Oz is a loose 1914 adaptation by Baum that became the basis for the book The Scarecrow of Oz.
 The Magic Cloak of Oz is another 1914 adaptation in the series produced by Baum himself via The Oz Film Manufacturing Company. It follows the story of Fluff, the unhappiest person in Oz, and a magic cloak fairies devised for him to grant her one wish.
 The Wizard of Oz (also issued without the definite article) is a 1925 film, directed by Larry Semon in collaboration with Frank Joslyn Baum and featuring a young Oliver Hardy.
 The Land of Oz, a Sequel to the Wizard of Oz is a 1932 2-reeler by Ethel Meglin performed by the Meglin Kiddies.  The soundtrack to the second reel is lost.  The film ends on a cliffhanger in which the protagonists escape the Emerald City riding on the back of the Tin Woodman, who is able to fly, rather than the Gump.
 The Wizard of Oz is the famous 1939 musical film by Metro-Goldwyn-Mayer, directed by Victor Fleming and starring Judy Garland, Ray Bolger, Jack Haley, Bert Lahr, Margaret Hamilton, and Frank Morgan. It is the story's best-known adaptation and the version about which most cultural references to the story are based.
 The Wonderful Land of Oz is a 1969 low-budget children's film adaptation of The Marvelous Land of Oz, directed by Barry Mahon.
 Return to Oz is a 1985 film by Walt Disney Pictures, directed by Walter Murch and starring Fairuza Balk as Dorothy.
 Oz the Great and Powerful is a 2013 film by Walt Disney Pictures, directed by Sam Raimi and starring James Franco, Michelle Williams and Mila Kunis.

Other Versions
The Wizard of Mars is a 1965 low budget science fiction film takeoff of L. Frank Baum's 1900 novel The Wonderful Wizard of Oz co-written and directed by stage magician David L. Hewitt.
 Oz is a 1976 Australian rock musical film, also known as Oz – A Rock 'n' Roll Road Movie or 20th Century Oz.
 The Wiz is a 1978 film directed by Sidney Lumet starring Diana Ross as Dorothy and Michael Jackson as the Scarecrow, based on the Broadway musical of the same name.
 After the Wizard is a 2012 independent film as a modern-day semi-sequel to the story.
 OzLand is a 2014 independent fantasy/sci-fi drama film inspired by characters and events from the book, which plays a crucial role.
 Apocalypse Oz is a 2006 short film parody of The Wizard of Oz and Apocalypse Now.

Live-action, foreign language 
 Fantasía... 3, 1966 a Spanish anthology film which use portion of Baum's original novel in one of its sequence.
 Ayşecik ve Sihirli Cüceler Rüyalar Ülkesinde is a 1971 Turkish film, directed by Tunç Başaran known to bootleggers as "The Turkish Wizard of Oz".
 Os Trapalhões e o Mágico de Oróz is 1984, Brazilian parody of Wizard of the Oz.
 The Wizard of the City of Emeralds is a 1994 Russian film version of Alexander Melentyevich Volkov's "adaptation" of Baum's original book.

Animation 
 The Wizard of Oz is a 1933 animated short directed by Ted Eshbaugh.
 Journey Back to Oz is a 1971 animated film, begun in 1962, finished in 1971 and eventually released between 1972 and 1974. It features Liza Minnelli, the daughter of Judy Garland, as the voice of Dorothy.
 Once Upon a Time is a 1973 film in which Maria and Mary-Lou get sucked down a well into Holleland. It is loosely based upon, and also pays homage to, The Wizard of Oz.
 The Wizard of the Emerald City is a stop-motion animated series, created in 1973-1974 in USSR. It’s based on Volkov’s Magic Land books but episodes 1-5 are essentially adaptation Baum’s original book too.
 The Wizard of Oz is a feature-length anime adaptation of the story produced by Toho in 1982 and directed by Fumihiko Takayama, with music by Joe Hisaishi. The English version of the movie stars Aileen Quinn as the voice of Dorothy and Lorne Greene as the Wizard. Original songs are sung by Aileen Quinn in the English version, with lyrics by Sammy Cahn and Allen Byrnes. In the U.S., it was released on video and syndicated to local television stations.
 W krainie czarnoksiężnika Oza (In the Land of the Wizard of Oz) was a stop-motion animated series, created in 1983 in Poland by Se-ma-for. It consisted of 13 episodes, and shared similarities (both spiritually and due to the animation techniques used) with Se-ma-for's earlier animated series, Opowiadania Muminków (The Moomins). The latter episodes of the series adapted Baum's book The Marvelous Land of Oz as well.
  Dorothy Meets Ozma of Oz is a 1987 direct-to video animated film produced by Kushner-Locke.
 The Wizard of Oz, a 1991 half-hour direct-to-video featurette produced by American Film Investment Corporation and animated by Korean based studio Dai Won.
 Adventures in the Emerald City is a 1999-2000 Russian four-episode animated series.
 The Haunted Journey (a.k.a. The Haunted Journey of Oz) is a 2006 British direct-to-video film, with Dorothy replaced with the more modern-looking Dolly, produced by Poseidon Films, based on the first two Oz books The Wizard of Oz and The Marvelous Land of Oz.
 Tom and Jerry and the Wizard of Oz is a Tom and Jerry direct-to-video film, the first to be made for Blu-ray. It first appeared on Cartoon Network on August 13, 2011. It was followed by a sequel, Tom and Jerry: Back to Oz, released February 3, 2016.
 Legends of Oz: Dorothy's Return is a 2014 American-Indian 3D animated musical adaptation of Dorothy of Oz by Roger S. Baum and stars Lea Michele.
 Guardians of Oz is a 2015 Mexican-Indian 3D computer animated adventure film directed by Alberto Mar. It features an original story and new characters.
 The Steam Engines of Oz is a 2018 Canadian Animated film directed by Sean O'Reilly which is produced by Arcana Studio. It tells the story of Oz a hundred years later and features new characters as well as old ones.

Television
Many of the television programs cited in this list are not strict adaptions of The Wizard of Oz; rather, they have reinterpreted aspects of the book, such as characters and plot, to create sequels, prequels or side-plots, which are inspired by Baum's original text.

 29 September 2006 in episode 70 (s7e4) of Codename: Kids Next Door episode "Operation: W.H.I.T.E.H.O.U.S.E." ends with Nigel Uno (Numbuh One) cosplayed as Dorothy Gale relating to others about his waking dream. He then wakes from it (another dream) commenting he needs to stop watching old movies.
 2 February 2008 Back at the Barnyard the last part of the episode "Lights! Camera! Moo!"
 20 September 2008  Kappa Mikey episode 52 "The Wizard of Ozu"
 14 January 2011 The Suite Life on Deck story-arc "Twister" (episodes 66-68)

 Rainbow Road to Oz was a proposed Walt Disney live-action production. A preview segment aired in 1957 on the Disneyland TV show, featuring Darlene Gillespie as Dorothy, Annette Funicello as Ozma, Bobby Burgess as the Scarecrow, Doreen Tracey as Scraps, the Patchwork Girl, and Jimmie Dodd as the Cowardly Lion.
 Beetlejuice "Wizard of Ooze" Lydia is Dorothy, BJ is the Scarecrow, Jacques is the Bone Woodsman, the Monster is the Lion, Ginger is Toto, Prudence and Bertha are the Good Witches North and South, Claire is the Wicked Witch and Mr. Monitor is the Wizard.
 The Land of Oz is the 1960 premiere episode of The Shirley Temple Show, known in previous seasons as Shirley Temple's Storybook, and no relation to the Shirley Temple Theatre which showcased old Temple films. This adaptation of The Marvelous Land of Oz was written by Frank Gabrielson and directed by William Corrigan. William Asher produced. The cast included Shirley Temple (Ozma/Tip), Ben Blue (The Scarecrow), Agnes Moorehead (Mombi), Sterling Holloway (Jack Pumpkinhead), Gil Lamb (The Tin Woodman), Jonathan Winters (Lord Nikidik), Arthur Treacher (Graves the Butler), and Mel Blanc (Voice of the sawhorse).
 Tales of the Wizard of Oz is a 1961 animated series of short episodes based on the Oz characters from the book.
 Off to See the Wizard is a 1967 television anthology series which showcased then-recent MGM family films. The Oz characters appeared in animated segments.
 Return to Oz is a 1964 animated television special sequel-remake of the 1939 film, based on the artistic renderings of the characters in the 1961 animated series.
 Manga Sekai Mukashi Banashi (1976-79), an anime television anthology, has a four 10-minute episodes adaptation.
 Saturday Night Live, on February 16, 1980, had a sketch called The Incredible Man, a parody of both The Wizard of Oz and the annual TV broadcast of the film that was standard at the time.
 Dino Dan: Trek's Adventures, an episode, The Wonderful Wizard of Dinoz.
 World Famous Fairy Tale Series (Sekai meisaku dōwa) (1975-83) featured in 1983 a 9-minute abridged version, which was later included by Saban in their adaptation of My Favorite Fairy Tales (1986).
 The Wonderful Wizard of Oz, an episodic anime adaptation of four of Baum's Oz books, was created in 1986. It consists of 52 episodes and follows the story of Dorothy and her adventures in Oz with the Tin Woodman, Cowardly Lion, and Scarecrow. It continues on to the story of Ozma and Mombi, and follows the events in other Oz books. In 1987, HBO purchased the rights to the series and edited together key episodes of the series into a series of movies, which aired as a television mini-series. Margot Kidder was the narrator. Production for the English version was done by the Canadian studio Cinar.
 In the 1987 series Hello Kitty's Furry Tale Theater, The Wizard of Paws is the first part of first episode. The story begins when after a huge tornado, Hello Dorothy (Hello Kitty) gets whisked away from her home of Catfish to The Land of Paws. Upon arrival, she is welcomed by the Tin Penguin (Tuxedo J Orville Sam), The Scarecrow (Chip), the Cowardly Rabbit (My Melody) and the Munchkits. They thank Hello Dorothy, as the Wicked Witch (Catnip) was about to turn them into cat litter. Just as that is said, the Wicked Witch arises from the house as Dorothy picks up the ruby collar. After crushing the Wicked Witch and taking her collar, the witch plans revenge on Hello Dorothy to take back her precious collar. Dorothy then begins her journey back to the land of Catfish with the penguin, scarecrow and rabbit in order to return home along the yellow block road.
 Funky Fables (Ponkikki Meisaku World) (1988-90), features an adaptation of The Wizard of Oz.
 The Wizard of Oz, an animated series based on the 1939 film, was broadcast on ABC during the 1990–1991 TV season. The cartoon featured Dorothy returning to Oz, reuniting with her four friends, and journeying through the magical realm in an attempt to rescue the Wizard from a resurrected Witch of the West.
 The Wonderful Galaxy of Oz (Space Oz no Bôken) is a 1990 Japanese anime series involving Dorothy and her friends in a futuristic setting, traveling the "Galaxy of Oz". It was truncated to 76 minutes and dubbed for the American release.
 World Fairy Tale Series (Anime sekai no dōwa) (1995), anime television anthology produced by Toei Animation, has half-hour adaptation.
 The Oz Kids is a 1996 animated series by Disney and Hyperion Pictures featuring the children of the original characters.
 The Muppets' Wizard of Oz (2005) Starring Ashanti, Queen Latifah and The Muppets. Miss Piggy plays all of the witches, Pepe plays Toto, Kermit plays the Scarecrow, Gonzo plays the Tin Man, and Fozzie plays the Lion.
 VeggieTales (The Wonderful Wizard Of Ha's) tells a story of  Darby (Junior Asparagus) who wants to have fun in the Wonderful Land of Ha's in order to make his dream come true.
 Tim Burton's Lost in Oz is a 2000 unrealized television pilot script written by Trey Callaway with Tim Burton as executive producer. Key scenes were filmed by Michael Katleman.
 Lost in Oz is a 2002 television pilot directed by Mick Garris but never broadcast. It is a sequel to the 1939 film.
 The Futurama episode "Anthology of Interest II" is a retelling of the Oz story, shown as a dream of one of the show's characters.
 The 100th episode of the television comedy-drama show Scrubs, titled "My Way Home" is a homage to the Wizard of Oz.
 Tin Man is a three-part miniseries released in December 2007 on the Sci-fi Channel by RHI Entertainment and Syfy. The miniseries, directed by Nick Willing and starring Zooey Deschanel, Richard Dreyfuss, Alan Cumming, Raoul Trujillo, Neal McDonough, and Kathleen Robertson, is a re-imagined version of The Wizard of Oz with a heavy science fantasy emphasis. The heroine, D.G., is a descendant of Dorothy Gale. Other humans, called "Slippers" by the people of Oz, have visited Oz since Gale's fateful adventure. The series portrays a future version of Oz, thereby making the mini-series both a sequel and a re-imagining.
 OzEnders, a 2003 charity special of EastEnders, saw the characters in a spoof remake of The Wizard of Oz. June Brown starred as Dorothy Cotton, Jon Culshaw as Ozzy Osbourne, and Adam Woodyatt as Ian Beale.
 Witches of Oz is a 2011 television mini-series directed by Leigh Scott, based on the novels The Wonderful Wizard of Oz, Ozma of Oz, The Road to Oz, and The Magic of Oz by Baum.
 Dorothy and the Witches of Oz is a 2012 film that was edited together out of the 2011 miniseries Witches of Oz. The film version removed about an hour of footage and updated the visual effects.
 An episode of SpongeBob SquarePants shows SpongeBob and Patrick going to see Mr. Magic. As in The Wizard of Oz, Mr. Magic, who was thought to be a giant, magical head, is revealed to be a powerless, little man.
 In 2012, the Nickelodeon show The Fresh Beat Band did a remake in a one-hour episode called "The Wizard of Song" with Marina as Dorothy, Kiki as Tin-woman, Twist as Scarecrow, and Shout as the Lion.
 In an episode of Rugrats, No Place Like Home, Susie dreams of a land like Oz after having her tonsils removed.
 In an episode of The Wonder Pets In the Land of Oz, The Wonder Pets get caught in a tornado and blown to the magical Land of Oz, and they need help getting home by The Scarecrow, The Tin Man and The Cowardly Lion by going to the Emerald City.
 An episode of Phineas and Ferb is titled Wizard of Odd. In order to wash their house quickly, Phineas and Ferb build a contraption that spins it around, causing Candace to become so dizzy, she faints. She soon finds herself in the magical land of Odd where Isabella, Dr. Doofenshmirtz, Jeremy, Buford, Baljeet, and Linda are remarkably like the characters from The Wizard of Oz.
 An episode of Mickey Mouse Clubhouse, "The Wizard of Dizz!", places Minnie and Pluto in the roles of Dorothy and Toto. Goofy, Mickey, and Donald appear as the Scarecrow, Tin Mouse, and Lion. Clarabelle Cow appears as the good witch, Pete as the bad witch, and Ludwig von Drake as the wizard.
 The characters Dorothy Gale and The Wicked Witch of the West make appearances in the 2014 episode "Slumber Party" from the ninth season of the television series Supernatural. Dorothy is revealed to be a hunter of evil and the daughter of L. Frank Baum. The Tin Man, Cowardly Lion, and Scarecrow all make appearances. The season 10 episode "There's No Place Like Home" tells of a war for the Emerald City in which the Wizard has been split into good and dark sides.
 The Wicked Witch of the West is the main antagonist in the second half of the third season of the ABC/Disney television series Once Upon a Time. In this version, the wicked witch was abandoned by her mother in the woods where a tornado took her to Oz.
 Emerald City is a television series in development by Universal Television that drew inspiration from L. Frank Baum's original 14 books. Created by Matthew Arnold, in January 2014 it had been officially picked up by NBC for 10 episodes. In August 2014, it was reported that NBC would not be proceeding with the series. In April 2015, NBC reversed course and announced that the series would move forward under the leadership of executive producer and writer David Schulner.
 On December 3, 2015, NBC aired the live television production The Wiz Live! Produced by Craig Zadan and Neil Meron, it is a performance of a new adaptation of the 1975 Broadway musical The Wiz, a soul/R&B reinterpretation of L. Frank Baum's The Wonderful Wizard of Oz. The performance aired live from Grumman Studios in Bethpage, New York.
 On June 26, 2015, Amazon Video released an original 24-minute pilot for an animated series, Lost in Oz.  On November 2, 2016, it was re-released with additional content under the title Lost in Oz: Extended Adventure. The two seasons series aired on August 4, 2017.
 Dorothy and the Wizard of Oz (originally Dorothy: Princess of Oz and Dorothy of Oz) is an animated series produced by Warner Bros. Animation. It was released in June 2017 for Boomerang's SVOD service. Clips of the series were revealed in the Boomerang upfront for 2017.
 In the Victorious episode "April Fools' Blank", the main characters retell the story in the girls' toilet of the Hollywood Arts.
 In the rebooted TV series Dynasty episode "That Witch", one of the main characters Fallon, gets knocked by an ornament and sees visions of herself as Dorothy in the Wizard of Oz.
 In the ‘’Dollface’’ season 1 episode “Feminist”, which aired on November 15, 2019, the main characters participate in a dream sequence that imagines Jules claiming ownership of red shoes left at her boss's beach house during a company retreat that was hosted there and symbolizes her inner conflict between covering for her friend who may be having an affair with the boss's husband and doing what is right by her fellow female. The story is riddled with elements and homage to the Wizard of Oz.
 A little known version of the original story made for British tv in 1995 set in the present day starred Denise Van Outen and included thematic elements from the OZ books, the 1939 film and the 1985 semi-sequel Return to OZ.

Theatre
 The Wizard of Oz, the first musical version of The Wonderful Wizard of Oz, was produced by L. Frank Baum and W. W. Denslow (with music by composer Paul Tietjens) in Chicago in 1902 and moved to New York in 1903. It used many of the same characters, and was aimed more at adult audiences. It had a long, successful run on Broadway. Baum added numerous political references to the script, mentioning President Theodore Roosevelt, Senator Mark Hanna, and John D. Rockefeller by name. Many existing songs that had nothing to do with the story were interpolated. Baum followed with two additional Oz musicals, The Woggle-Bug (1905) and The Tik-Tok Man of Oz (1913). Both were panned as rehashes rather than sequels; Tik-Tok did better than The Woggle-Bug but neither made it to Broadway.
 The Wizard of Oz is a 1942 musical using songs from the 1939 film. It was adapted by Frank Gabrielson for the St. Louis Municipal Opera. The piece continues to receive frequent revivals.
 In 1959, the popular ice skating show Holiday on Ice included a condensed version of The Wizard of Oz.
 The Wiz is a 1975 musical with music and lyrics by Charlie Smalls, exclusively featuring African American actors. Stephanie Mills starred as Dorothy in the original Broadway cast. The production won the 1975 Tony Award for Best Musical. Geoffrey Holder directed a 1984 Broadway revival, which also featured Mills as Dorothy.
 The Marvelous Land of Oz is a 1981 musical by Thomas W. Olson, Gary Briggle and Richard Dworsky. The original production, which included Briggle as the Scarecrow, was taped and shown on television.
 The Wizard of Oz is a 1987 adaptation by John Kane for the Royal Shakespeare Company based on the novel and 1939 film, which hews more closely to the film's screenplay than the 1942 version. This show ran through 1989 and continues to be frequently revived and toured.
 The Wizard of A.I.D.S. is a 1987 adaptation of the Oz story which serves as an AIDS education tool.
 The Wizard of Oz Live (1989–1990) is an arena touring production of the 1987 version in celebration of the film's 50th anniversary. The production featured a pre-recorded soundtrack.
 The Wizard of Oz in Concert: Dreams Come True was a 1995 concert performance of the Royal Shakespeare Company's adaptation at Lincoln Center, featuring celebrity actors such as Jewel as Dorothy, Jackson Browne as the Scarecrow, Roger Daltrey as the Tin Man, Nathan Lane as the Lion, and Joel Grey as the Wizard (a role he later reprised in Wicked). The production also featured Debra Winger, Natalie Cole, and Lucie Arnaz.
The Wizard of Oz on Ice was a Kenneth Feld production that toured from 1995 to 1999, based on the film and was choreographed by Robin Cousins. It featured a pre-recorded soundtrack with the voices of Laurena Wilkerson as Dorothy and Bobby McFerrin as all of the other characters (including the female characters).  It toured nationally and internationally and was broadcast in 1996 with Oksana Baiul skating as Dorothy and Victor Petrenko as the Scarecrow. Shanice was the prerecorded voice of Dorothy in the TV broadcast.
 The Wizard of Oz on Tour was a 1998 touring production of the 1987 RSC version that originally played in the Madison Square Garden theatre in May 1997. Roseanne Barr was the Wicked Witch, replaced by Eartha Kitt in 1998 and JoAnne Worley and Liliane Montevecchi in 1999. Mickey Rooney was the Wizard. The production played at Madison Square Garden from May 1997 to May 1999. The touring production ran from May 1998 to late 1999.
 Wicked (2003–Present) is a 2003 Broadway and West End musical based on the book Wicked: The Life and Times of the Wicked Witch of the West by Gregory Maguire. Universal Pictures had bought film rights to the 1995 novel when composer and lyricist Stephen Schwartz convinced the company to adapt the novel into a musical instead. Schwartz wrote Wickeds music and lyrics and it premiered on Broadway in October 2003.
 The Wonderful Wizard of Oz (musical) is a 2000 musical that premiered in Toronto. The show was revived in 2002, 2010 and again in 2017.
 In 2005 there was a children musical in Balver Höhle
 The Wizard of Oz is a 2011 West End musical, building on the 1939 film songs and script with new material by Tim Rice and Andrew Lloyd Webber. It began previews on February 7, 2011 and officially opened on March 1. Danielle Hope, of the BBC television Series Over the Rainbow, appeared as Dorothy. Michael Crawford plays the role of the Wizard.
 The Royal New Zealand Ballet premiered a Wizard of Oz ballet in May 2016 at the St. James Theatre, Wellington using a score created by composer Francis Poulenc. The ballet then toured New Zealand throughout May and June 2016.
 In 2015, a Costa Rican adaptation of both the novel and the 1939 film titled El OH!8 was premiered. The stage play is an open criticism of the country's laws against LGBT marriage, using the original plot and similar musical numbers.
 In 2018, musical "Čarobnjak iz Oza" premieref in Children's Theatre in Osijek, Croatia.

Books
There are over 40 canonical Oz books, including 14 by Baum, all of which are considered "official" sequels or prequels to The Wonderful Wizard of Oz. In addition, the following books use the Oz milieu as settings for their tales:
 The Wizard of the Emerald City, a 1939 children's novel by Russian writer Alexander Melentyevich Volkov, is a loose translation of The Wonderful Wizard of Oz. It was adapted into animated series (1973) and a live action film (1994). It has five sequels by the same author.
 The Number of the Beast is a science fiction novel written by Robert A. Heinlein in 1980. The story uses Oz as one of many alternate universe settings in which events take place, alongside alternate versions of the setting's Earth.
 A Barnstormer in Oz is a 1982 novel by Philip José Farmer in which a pilot named Hank Stover, who is Dorothy's son, is transported to Oz when his plane becomes lost in a green cloud over Kansas.
 Was, Geoff Ryman's 1992 parallel novel, imagines three interwoven narratives: one of a real-life "Dorothy Gael" whose experiences are far from wonderful, the second loosely based on Judy Garland's own childhood, and the third story featuring a gay male actor who loves the 1939 film. Was was republished in 2014 by Small Beer Press.
 Home from Oz (Thomas Nelson, 1994) and The Oz Syndrome (Hillcrest Publishers, 2001) are two books penned by psychologist and professor, Dr.Michael A. O'Donnell which deal with the Oz characters and the MGM musical version from a psychological point of view.
 Wicked: The Life and Times of the Wicked Witch of the West, a revisionist look at the land and characters of Oz, was published in 1995 by Gregory Maguire. Instead of depicting Dorothy, the novel focuses on Elphaba, the future Wicked Witch of the West. The Independent characterized the novel as "an adult read reflecting on the nature of being an outcast, society's pressures to conform, and the effects of oppression and fascism". Wicked has three sequels: Son of a Witch (2005), A Lion Among Men (2008) and Out of Oz (2011). Wicked was adapted into a 2003 stage musical.
 Oz Reimagined: New Tales from the Emerald City and Beyond is a 2013 anthology edited by Douglas Cohen & John Joseph Adams published by Amazon Publishing's 47North imprint.
 Dorothy Must Die is a 2014 young adult book by Danielle Paige and makes up part of the Dorothy Must Die series, which also includes three prequel novellas: No Place Like Oz, The Witch Must Burn and The Wizard Returns, which were published together in March 2015. The next three prequel novellas, Heart of Tin, The Straw King and Ruler of Beasts, were released in a paperback book titled Dorothy Must Die Stories: Volume #2 on June 28, 2016. Two more novellas, Order of the Wicked and Dark Side of the Rainbow, have also been released. A sequel titled The Wicked Will Rise was published on March 30, 2015, following the events of Dorothy Must Die. The third installment of the series titled Yellow Brick War was published on March 15, 2016. The fourth and final book, The End of Oz, was published on March 14, 2017.

Comics

 MGM's Marvelous Wizard of Oz was the first joint publishing venture between DC Comics and Marvel Comics.
 Marvel Treasury of Oz printed The Marvelous Land of Oz.
 One of the issues of Classics Illustrated Junior was a condensed version of The Wizard of Oz.
 The comic book series Oz Squad features an adult Dorothy and her original companions from The Wonderful Wizard of Oz as a covert operations group protecting Oz from threats both within its borders and from the "real world".
 The Oz-Wonderland War is a comics story in which the people of Oz fight together with the characters of Lewis Carroll's Alice's Adventures in Wonderland and Through the Looking-Glass against the villainous Nome King. It also starred Captain Carrot and the Zoo Crew and was originally intended to be the comic's issues #21–26. The comic, however, was cancelled at #20, and the story was subsequently presented as a mini-series.
 Dorothy of Oz (Korean:Dorosi) is a manhwa (Korean comic) by Son Hee-joon about an ordinary girl named Mara Shin who winds up in a science-fantasy realm called "Oz". She meets up with this realm's version of the Scarecrow, the Tin Woodsman and the Cowardly Lion, and follows the Yellow Brick Road to find her way home.
 The comic book Dorothy was launched by Illusive Arts Entertainment in November 2005. Presented in semi-fumetti style using digitally altered photographs, this retelling of Baum's story has been updated to 2005 and features model Catie Fisher as 16-year-old Dorothy Gale, a disaffected youth with dyed hair and piercings who steals her uncle's car and runs away from home; until she encounters a tornado and is knocked unconscious.
 An erotic re-telling of the story is featured in Lost Girls, a graphic novel by Alan Moore and Melinda Gebbie first published in its entirety in 2006. In this book, an adult Dorothy meets Alice from Alice's Adventures in Wonderland and Wendy Darling from Peter Pan and the trio recount the stories of their respective works as allegories for their sexual awakenings.
 The Wonderful Wizard of Oz, published by Marvel Comics.
 Marvel Fairy Tales features a retelling of The Wizard of Oz starring Marvel characters, such as the She-Hulk as Dorothy and the Scarlet Witch as the Wicked Witch of the West.
 The Steam Engines of Oz is a graphic novel series published by Arcana Studio. It is a "steampunk re-imagining" of The Wonderful Wizard of Oz.

Games
 The Wonderful Game of Oz, a board game published in 1921 by Parker Brothers.
 The Wizard of Oz, a 1985 illustrated text adventure game for Apple II, Commodore 64 and DOS systems, which combined elements of The Wonderful Wizard of Oz and The Marvelous Land of Oz. It was published by Windham Classics, a subsidiary of Spinnaker Software.
 The Wizard of Oz, a 1993 video game for the Super NES, based on the 1939 film.
 The Yellow Brick Road (イエロー ・ブリツク ・ロード) trilogy, a multiplatform adventure RPG series developed in Japan by SYNERGY.
 Wizard of Land Oz (Волшебник страны Оз), a 1997 ZX Spectrum adventure game by Famous Faces Factory.
 Irozuki Tincle no Koi no Balloon Trip, a Japanese game which is a spin-off of The Legend of Zelda series. It features Tingle teaming up with a tin woman, a scarecrow and a cowardly lion to cross the land. Released in 2009.
 Emerald City Confidential, a point-and-click adventure game developed by Wadjet Eye Games and published by casual game portal PlayFirst. Released in 2009.
 RIZ-ZOAWD, a Japanese role-playing video game for the Nintendo DS, released in the US as The Wizard of Oz: Beyond the Yellow Brick Road. Released in 2008.
The Wizard of Oz, a coin pusher game found in video arcades.
 Wizard of Oz Slots game found in Casinos. The game is a five-reel video slot machine with bonus feature rounds, produced by WMS (Williams Gaming). Released in 2013.
 The Card Game of Oz, a 2014 game created by James C. O'Connor under his Orion's Bell label. The game is based on the original books. Series 1, The Wonderful Wizard of Oz, was released in May 2014. Series 2, The Marvelous Land of Oz, was released in August 2014 as an expansion.
 The crossover-genre video game Lego Dimensions features a world based on the 1939 film.
 The mobile game Oz: Broken Kingdom Is based on the world of Oz and takes place after the original story.

Music videos with Wizard of Oz themed imagery 
 The band Blues Traveler's video of the song "Run-Around" has a Wizard of Oz motif, with Blues Traveler playing behind a curtain in a nightclub while a young, "hip" and more "photogenic" group appears to be playing the song.
 The band The Good Life's video for the song "Heartbroke" has characters from The Wizard of Oz going to a pastry/ice cream shop. There are two versions to this video; a "nice" version and a "mean" version. In the "nice" version the characters pretend to rob the shop but then purchase treats. In the "mean" version they violently rob the store, but the Scarecrow (who was supposed to be the getaway car) does not make it on time due to a flat tire and the would-be robbers get arrested.
 The Black Eyed Peas music video "Imma Be Rocking That Body" has claimed to be the futuristic version of The Wizard of Oz.
 Tech N9ne's "He's A Mental Giant" follows the plot to the Wizard of Oz with darker imagery.
 "Oooh" by De La Soul is a music video that shows the Land of Oooh which is heavily based on the Land of Oz.
 Sara Evans stars as Dorothy in her music video "Born to Fly".
 The music video for "La la la" by Naughty Boy featuring Sam Smith shows a young boy traveling around a city meeting characters resembling the Lion, the Tin Man, and the Scarecrow.
 Nirvana's video for "Heart-Shaped Box" makes extensive use of symbolism, much of which touches on Oz themes and imagery. The bulk of the video takes place in a field of fake poppies. The video also shows a stand of 'spooky' trees, and a pointed hat sinking into a puddle, which bear a resemblance to the 1939 film. Additionally, there are multiple shots of a man suspended in a crucified position from a rough cross and adorned with ravens in a manner more suggestive of a scarecrow.
 The music video for "Heretics and Killers" by Protest The Hero shows the flying monkeys featured in the Wizard of Oz.

Other media
 In September 1933, The Wizard of Oz debuted on the NBC radio network, sponsored by General Foods Corporation. It presented dramatizations of episodes from the book.
 In 1967, The Seekers recorded "Emerald City", with lyrics about a visit there, set to the melody of Beethoven's "Ode to Joy".
 Todd McFarlane created a sinister toy series called Twisted Land of Oz that portrays all of the characters as more sinister (such as the monster Toto) and adult oriented (BDSM Dorothy).
 The rock band Aerosmith put some original audios from the 1939 movie and Steven Tyler's voice repeating some quotes of the characters in the song The Farm in the album 'Nine Lives' from 1997.
 Walt Disney originally wanted to make an animated version of The Wizard Of Oz to serve as the follow-up to Snow White and the Seven Dwarfs, but the film rights were bought by Samuel Goldwyn, who originally intended to make it as a standard musical comedy, with Eddie Cantor as his star. However, Goldwyn ended up selling the rights to MGM.
 The Felice Brothers wrote a song called "Don't Wake the Scarecrow" which features several references to The Wizard of Oz.
 American McGee's Oz was a darkly, twisted series of figurines based on Baum's original Wizard of Oz characters. This series was released before McFarlane's, and was supposed to help McGee launch a franchise around this interpretation.
 Stargate SG-1 has several verbal references to The Wizard of Oz, including Colonel Jack O'Neill calling Samantha Carter "Dorothy" when she defeated one of the show's villains.
 The band Scissor Sisters released a song on their self-titled album called "Return to Oz", referencing the sequel.
 The John Boorman film Zardoz derives its title from the Wizard of Oz (The WiZARD of OZ).
 Elton John's album Goodbye Yellow Brick Road is a clear reference to The Wizard of Oz.
 The Wiyos's album Twist is an original song cycle loosely based on The Wizard of Oz.
 Ray Bradbury's short story "The Exiles" mentions the Emerald City and its inhabitants existing alongside other famous literary characters and locales on a Martian colony.
 Big Finish Productions made a full-cast audio drama adaptation of the novel, adapted by Marc Platt.
 Tom and Jerry: Back to Oz is the sequel to Tom and Jerry and the Wizard of Oz and is a Tom and Jerry direct-to-video film.
 AIEC Wizard of Oz is a short film parody of The Wizard of Oz starring characters from the Adventure In Epic's Chat web series.
 Edward W. Hardy released a cast album entitled The Woodsman (Original Off-Broadway Solo Recording)
 "Straight Outta Oz" is a studio album and original musical written and produced by Todrick Hall. It is based on the Wizard of Oz whilst being a semi-autobiographical account of his rise to fame in Los Angeles (Oz). The trailer for the album was first released on May 13, 2016. Todrick has released the musical in the form of (as well as each song separately) on his YouTube channel on March 21, 2017. It includes a host of guest stars including Nicole Scherzinger, Jordin Sparks, Perez Hilton, Joseph Gordon-Levitt, Amber Riley, Raven Symoné, and Tamar Braxton.

References

Further reading
Kevin Scott Collier. The Wonderful Animated World of the Wizard of Oz: The Good, The Bad and The Ugly! CreateSpace Independent Publishing Platform, 2018. 

 
Wizard of Oz